The Tamil units of measurement is a system of measurements that was traditionally used in ancient Tamil-speaking parts of  South India.

These ancient measurement systems spanned systems of counting, distances, volumes, time, weight as well as tools used to do so. While modern India uses the metric system International System of Units (Tamil Nadu state included), some of these older day measurement systems, especially those of counting, are still used today.

Other units that have persisted are those of area – the 'ma' (not to be confused with the dollar-cent) and the ‘ground’, both used to measure land and the ‘molam’ which has been relegated to measuring the length of a sandanam garland sold on streets.

There are several similarities between the measurement system used in Tamil Nadu and that used by the Indus Valley civilisation. Recent excavation studies from Keezhadi reveal existence of an older non-vedic civilisation in Tamil Nadu. New discovery suggest possibilities of source of ancient Indian mathematicians in Tamil Nadu.

Units of time in ancient Tamil history 

10  (kuzḻigaḷ) = 1  (miy) = 66.6666 millisecond-the time taken by the young human eyes to flap once.
2  (kaṇṇimaigaḷ) = 1  (kainoḍi) = 0.125 second
2  (kainoḍi) = 1  (māttirai) = 0.25 second
6  (miygaḷ) = 1  (ciṟṟuḻi (noḍi)) = 0.40 second-the time taken for a bubble (created by blowing air through a bamboo tube into a vessel 1  (cāṇ) high, full of water) to travel a distance of one  (cāṇ).
2  (māttiraigaḷ) = 1  (kuṟu) = 0.50 second
2  (noḍigaḷ) = 1  (viṉāḍi) = 0.80 second-the time for the adult human heart to beat once
2  (noḍigaḷ) = 2  (kuṟu) = 1  (uyir) = 1 second
5  (noḍigaḷ) = 2  (uyir) = 1  (cāṇigam) = 1/2  (aṇu) = 2 seconds
10  (noḍigaḷ) = 1  (aṇu) = 4 seconds
6  (aṇukkaḷ) = 12  (cāṇigam) = 1  (tuḷi) = 1  (nāḻigai-viṉāḍi) = 24 seconds
10  (tuḷigaḷ) = 1  (kaṇam) = 4 minutes
6  (kaṇangaḷ) = 1  (nāḻigai) = 24 minutes
10  (nāḻigaikaḷ) = 4  (cāmam) = 1  (ciṟupoḻutu) = 240 minutes = 4 hours
6  (ciṟu-poḻutugaḷ) = 1  (nāḷ) = 1 day = 24 hours
7  (nāṭkaḷ) = 1  (vāram) = 1 week
15  (nāṭkaḷ) = 1  (aḻuvaluvamam) = 1 fortnight
29  (nāṭkaḷ) = 1  (tingaḷ) = 1 lunar month
2  (tingaḷ) = 1  (perum-poḻutu) = 1 season
6  (perum-poḻutu) = 1  (āṇdu) = 1 year
64  (āṇdukaḷ) = 1  (vaṭṭam) = 1 cycle
64 வட்டம்/cycles = 4096  (āṇdukaḷ) = 1  ōḻi = 1 epoch

Area Measurement

1  (marakkaḷ vitaippatu, seeds required for planting rice) = 8 cents
12  (marakkaḷ vitaippatu) = 100 cents
1  (kuṟuṇi) = 8 cents
1  (patakku) = 16 cents
1  (mukkuṟuṇi) = 24 cents
1 sq  (kajam) =  cents
1  (vīsam) = 36 sq ft
303  (kuzhi) = 100 cents
1  (kuzhi) = 144 சதுர அடி (144 sq ft = 12 ft x 12 ft)
1  (mā) = 100  (kuzhi)
1  (kāṇi) = 4  (mā)
1  (vēļi) = 5  (kāṇi)
1 தாக்கு  (thakku) = 7.56 சதுர அடி (Sq. ft)

In Jaffna, Sri Lanka For House property
1 Parappu = 1 Lacham = 10 Perches
16 Parappu = 1 Acre

Varaku Culture (V.C.)
18 kulies    = 1 lacham
16 lachams   = 1 acre

Paddy Culture (P.C.)
12 kulies   = 1 lacham
24 lachams  = 1 acre

Units of ancient trade

Balance weights

Thanga edaihal
4 nel eḍai (நல் எடை) = 1 kuṉṟimaṇi (குன்றிமணி)
2 kuṉṟimaṇi (குன்றிமணி) = 1 māñcāḍi (மஞ்சாடி)
1 māñcāḍi (மஞ்சாடி) = 1 paṇaveḍai (பணவெடை)
5 paṇaveḍai (பணவெடை) = 1 kaḻañcu (கழஞ்சு)
8 paṇaveḍai (பணவெடை) = 1 varāgaṉeḍai (வராகனெடை)
20 paṇaveḍai (பணவெடை) = 4 kaḻañcu (கழஞ்சு) = 1 kaqhsu (கஃசு)
80 paṇaveaḍai (பணவெடை)= 16 kaḻañcu (கழஞ்சு)= 4 kaqhsu (கஃசு)= 1 palam (பலம்)
1.5 Kaḻan
cu (கழஞ்சு) = 8 grams or one sovereign/pavun.
The above is not in line with South Indian Inscriptions.
2 kuṉṟima குன்றிமணி = 1 māñcāḍi மஞ்சாடி
20 māñcāḍi மஞ்சாடி = 1 kaḻañcu கழஞ்சு
Ceylon Currency and Coins by H W Codrington page 10 too agrees with 20 māñcāḍi = 1 kaḻañcu.

Porutkal yedaihal
32 kuṉṟimaṇi = 1 varāgaṉeḍai
10 varāgaṉeḍai = 1 palam
40 palam = 1 veesai
1000 palam = 1 kā
6 veesai = 1 tulām
8 veesai = 1 maṇangu
20 maṇangu = 1 pāram.

Grain volume
1 kuṇam = smallest unit of volume
9 kuṇam = 1 mummi
11 mummi = 1 aṇu
7 aṇu = 1 immi
7 immi = 1 uminel
1 sittigai = 7 uminel
360 nel = 1 sevidu
5 sevidu = 1 āḻākku
2 āḻākku = 1 uḻakku
2 uḻakku = 1 uri
2 uri = 1 padi@
8 padi = 1 marakkaal (kuṟuṇi)
2 marakkāl (kuṟuṇi) = 1 padakku
2 padakku = 1 tōṇi
3 tōṇi = 1 kalam (= 96 padi)
5 marakkāl = 1 paṟai
80 paṟai = 1 karisai
96 padi = 1 pothi (mōdai)
21 marakkal = 1 Kottai
22 mākāni = 100 g
1 padi = 1800 avarai pods = 12,800 miḷagu seeds = 14,400 nel grains = 14,800 payaṟu grains = 38,000 arisi grains = 115,200 sesame ellu seeds

Fluid volume
5 sevidu = 1 āḻākku
2 mahani = 1 āḻākku (arai kal padi)
2 āḻākku = 1 uḻakku (Kal padi)
2 uḻakku = 1 uri (Arai padi)
2 uri = 1 padi
4 padi= 1 marakkaal
2 marakkāl (kuṟuṇi) = 1 padakku
2 padakku = 1 tōṇi
21 Marakkal = 1 Kottai

Length 
1 Koan = (115.8953125 picometre)
10 Koan = 1 Nunnanu (0.1158953125 nanometre)
10 Nunnanu = 1 Aṇu (atom) (1.158953125 nanometre)
8 Aṇu = 1 Kadirtugal (9.271625 nanometre)
8 Kadirtugal = 1 Tusumbu (74.173 nanometre)
8 Tusumbu = 1 Mayirnuni (0.593384 micrometre)
8 Mayirnuni = 1 Nunnmanal (4.74707 micrometre)
8 Nunnmanal = 1 Siru-kadugu (37.976563 micrometre)
8 Siru-kadugu = 1 Yel (303.8125 micrometre or 0.3038125 millimetre)
8 Yel = 1 Nel (2.4305 millimetre)
8 nel = 1 viral = 8^8 aṇu (atom) = 1.9444 centimetre
12 viral = 1 sāṇ = 100 immi= 23.3333 centimetre = 9 inch
2 sāṇ = 1 muḻam = 46.6666 centimetre = 1.5 feet
2 sāṇ = 1 muḻam
2 muḻam = 1 yard = 3 feet = 1 yard
2 yard(yaar) = 1 pāgam
110 pāgam = 1 furlong
8 furlong = 1 mile
5 furlong = 1 kilometre or 1000 metre
625 pāgam = 1 kādam = 5000 sāṇ = 1166.66 metres = 1.167 kilometre

Likeness (Sārttal)
Likeness has attributes of tone, sound, colour and shape for comparison of a given substance with a known standard.

Whole numbers

The following are the traditional numbers of the Ancient Tamil Country, Tamizhakam.

Tamil texts also elaborate the following sanskritized version :

 1 ONDRU = One = 10 0
 10 = PATU = Ten = 10 1
 100 = NŌRU = Hundred = 10 2
 1,000 = ĀYIRAM = One Thousand = 10 3
 10,000 = PATĀYIRAM = Ten Thousand = 10 4
 1,00,000 = LATCHAM = Hundred Thousand = 10 5
 10,00,000 = PATHU LATCHAM = One Million = 10 6
 1,00,00,000 = KODI = Ten Million = 10 7
 10,00,00,000 = PATHU KODI = Hundred Million = 10 8
 1,00,00,00,000 = ARPUTAM = One Billion = 10 9
 10,00,00,00,000 = PATU ARPUTAM = Ten Billion = 10 10
 1,00,00,00,00,000 = NIGARPUTAM = Hundred Billion = 10 11
 10,00,00,00,00,000 = PATU NIGARPUTAM = One Trillion = 10 12
 1,00,00,00,00,00,000 = KUMBAM = Ten Trillion = 10 13
 10,00,00,00,00,00,000 = PATU KUMBAM = Hundred Trillion = 10 14
 1,00,00,00,00,00,00,000 = GANAM = One Quadrillion = 10 15
 10,00,00,00,00,00,00,000 = PATHU GANAM = Ten Quadrillion = 10 16
 1,00,00,00,00,00,00,00,000 = KARPAM = Hundred Quadrillion = 10 17
 10,00,00,00,00,00,00,00,000 = PATU KARPAM = One Quintillion = 10 18
 1,00,00,00,00,00,00,00,00,000 = NIKARPAM = Ten Quintillion = 10 19
 10,00,00,00,00,00,00,00,00,000 = PATU NIKARPAM = Hundred Quintillion = 10 20
 1,00,00,00,00,00,00,00,00,00,000 = PATUMAM = One Sextillion = 10 21
 10,00,00,00,00,00,00,00,00,00,000 = PATU PATUMAM = Ten Sextillion = 10 22
 1,00,00,00,00,00,00,00,00,00,00,000 = SANGGAM = Hundred Sextillion = 10 23
 10,00,00,00,00,00,00,00,00,00,00,000 = PATU SANGGAM = One Septillion = 10 24
 1,00,00,00,00,00,00,00,00,00,00,00,000 = VELLAM = Ten Septillion = 10 25
 10,00,00,00,00,00,00,00,00,00,00,00,000 = PATU VELLAM = Hundred Septillion = 10 26
 1,00,00,00,00,00,00,00,00,00,00,00,00,000 = ANNIYAM = One Octillion = 10 27
 10,00,00,00,00,00,00,00,00,00,00,00,00,000 = PATU ANNIYAM = Ten Octillion = 10 28
 1,00,00,00,00,00,00,00,00,00,00,00,00,00,000 = ARTTAM = Hundred Octillion = 10 29
 10,00,00,00,00,00,00,00,00,00,00,00,00,00,000 = PATHU ARTTAM = One Nonillion = 10 30
 1,00,00,00,00,00,00,00,00,00,00,00,00,00,00,000 = PARARTTAM = Ten Nonillion = 10 31
 10,00,00,00,00,00,00,00,00,00,00,00,00,00,00,000 = PATU PARARTTAM = Hundred Nonillion = 10 32
 1,00,00,00,00,00,00,00,00,00,00,00,00,00,00,00,000 = PŌRIYAM = One Decillion = 10 33
 10,00,00,00,00,00,00,00,00,00,00,00,00,00,00,00,000 = PATU PŌRIYAM = Ten Decillion = 10 34
 1,00,00,00,00,00,00,00,00,00,00,00,00,00,00,00,00,000 = MUKKODI = Hundred Decillion = 10 35
 10,00,00,00,00,00,00,00,00,00,00,00,00,00,00,00,00,000 = PATU MUKKODI = One Undecillion = 10 36
 1,00,00,00,00,00,00,00,00,00,00,00,00,00,00,00,00,00,000 = MAHAYUGAM = Ten Undecillion = 10 37

Malaysian text elaborates the following version

 1 ONDRU = One = 10 0
 10 = PATU = Ten = 10 1
 100 = NŌRU = Hundred = 10 2
 1,000 = ĀYIRAM = One Thousand = 10 3
 10,000 = PATĀYIRAM = Ten Thousand = 10 4
 100,000 = LATCHAM = Hundred Thousand = 10 5
 1,000,000 = PATU LATCHAM = One Million = 10 6
 10,000,000 = KODI = Ten Million = 10 7
 100,000,000 = PATU KODI = Hundred Million = 10 8
 1,000,000,000 = NŌRU KODI = One Billion = 10 9

Fractions
 1 – ஒன்று – onRu
 3/4 = 0.75 – முக்கால் – mukkāl
 1/2 = 0.5 – அரை – arai
 1/4 = 0.25 – கால் – kāl
 1/5 = 0.2 – நாலுமா – nālumā
 3/16 = 0.1875 – மும்மாகாணி –mummākāṇi this is called as Mukkhani
 3/20 = 0.15 – மும்மா – mummaa
 1/8 = 0.125 – அரைக்கால் – araikkāl
 1/10 = 0.1 – இருமா – irumā
 1/16 = 0.0625 – மாகாணி (வீசம்) – mākāṇi (vīsam)
 1/20 = 0.05 – ஒருமா – orumā
 3/64 = 0.046875 – முக்கால்வீசம் – mukkāl vīsam
 3/80 = 0.0375 – முக்காணி – mukkāṇi
 1/32 = 0.03125 – அரைவீசம் – araivīsam
 1/40 = 0.025 – அரைமா – araimā
 1/64 = 0.015625 – கால் வீசம் – kaal vīsam
 1/80 = 0.0125 – காணி – kāṇi
 3/320 = 0.009375 – அரைக்காணி முந்திரி – araikkāṇi muntiri
 1/160 = 0.00625 – அரைக்காணி – araikkāṇi
 1/320 = 0.003125 – முந்திரி – muntiri
 3/1280 = 0.00234375 – கீழ் முக்கால் – kīḻ mukkal
 1/640 = 0.0015625 – கீழரை – kīḻarai
 1/1280 = 7.8125e-04 – கீழ் கால் – kīḻ kāl
 1/1600 = 0.000625 – கீழ் நாலுமா – kīḻ nalumā
 3/5120 ≈ 5.85938e-04 – கீழ் மூன்று வீசம் – kīḻ mūndru vīsam
 3/6400 = 4.6875e-04 – கீழ் மும்மா – kīḻ mummā
 1/2500 = 0.0004 – கீழ் அரைக்கால் – kīḻ araikkāl
 1/3200 = 3.12500e-04 – கீழ் இருமா – kīḻ irumā
 1/5120 ≈ 1.95313e-04 – கீழ் வீசம் – kīḻ vīsam
 1/6400 = 1.56250e-04 – கீழொருமா – kīḻ orumā
 1/102400 ≈ 9.76563e-06 – கீழ்முந்திரி – kīḻ muntiri
 1/2150400 ≈ 4.65030e-07 – இம்மி – immi
 1/23654400 ≈ 4.22754e-08 – மும்மி – mummi
 1/165580800 ≈ 6.03935e-09 – அணு – aṇu
 1/1490227200 ≈ 6.71039e-10 – குணம் – kuṇam
 1/7451136000 ≈ 1.34208e-10 – பந்தம் – pantam
 1/44706816000 ≈ 2.23680e-11 – பாகம் – pāgam
 1/312947712000 ≈ 3.19542e-12 – விந்தம் – vintam
 1/5320111104000 ≈ 1.87966e-13 – நாகவிந்தம் – nāgavintam
 1/74481555456000 ≈ 1.34261e-14 – சிந்தை – sintai
 1/1489631109120000 ≈ 6.71307e-16 – கதிர்முனை –katirmunai
 1/59585244364800000 ≈ 1.67827e-17 – குரல்வளைப்படி –kuralvaḷaippiḍi
 1/3575114661888000000 ≈ 2.79711e-19 -வெள்ளம் – veḷḷam
 1/357511466188800000000 ≈ 2.79711e-21 – நுண்மணல் –nuṇmaṇal
 1/2323824530227200000000 ≈ 4.30325e-22 – தேர்த்துகள் –tērttugaḷ

Currency 
 1 pal (wooden discs/sea shellots) = (approximately) 0.9 grain
 8 (or 10 base 8) paṟkaḷ = 1 senkāṇi (copper/bronze) = 7.2 grains(misinterpretted by Roman accounts as 10 base 10 paRkal = 9 grains)
 1/4 senkāṇi = 1 kālkāṇi (copper) = 1.8 grains (misinterpretted by Roman accounts as 2.25 grains)
 64 (or 100 base 8) paṟkaḷ = 1 KaaNap-pon aka. Kāsu panam(gold) = 57.6 grains
 1 Roman dinarium was traded on par with 2 Kāṇappon plus 1 Senkāṇi(=124 grains).
 18 Ana = 2.85 Rupee, 16 Ana = 1 Rupee, 1 Ana = 3 Tuṭu, 1/4 Ana = 3/4 (mukkal) tuṭu

Divisions of a Day 
சிறுபொழுது (Daily) 
1. மாலை (mālai): 6 pm-10 pm 
2. இடையாமம் (iḍaiyāmam): 10 pm-2 am 
3. வைகறை (vaikaṟai): 2 am-6 am 
4. காலை (kālai): 6 am-10 am 
5. நண்பகல் (naṇpagal): 10 am-2 pm 
6. எற்பாடு (eṟpāḍu): 2 pm-6 pm

Divisions of the Year 
பெரும்பொழுது (பெரும்பொழுது என்பது யாது எனில்
பன்னிரு மாதங்களை ஆறாய்ப் பகுத்தது)

1. கார்காலம் (Kārkālam): ஆடி, ஆவணி 
2. குளிர்காலம் (Kuḷirkālam): புரட்டாசி, ஐப்பசி 
3. முன்பனிக் காலம்(Muṉpaṉik kālam): கார்த்திகை, மார்கழி 
4. பின்பனிக் காலம் (Piṉpaṉik kālam): தை, மாசி 
5. இளவேனில் (Iḷavēṉil): பங்குனி, சித்திரை 
6. முதுவேனில் (Mutuvēṉil) :வைகாசி, ஆனி

See also 
Tamil Calendar

References

Sources
3. http://tvaraj.com/2012/03/06/fractions-used-by-ancient-tamils/
Tamil Measurements

Tamil
Obsolete units of measurement
Systems of units
Economic history of Tamil Nadu